The manga series JoJo's Bizarre Adventure is written and illustrated by Hirohiko Araki. It was originally serialized in Weekly Shōnen Jump from 1987 to 2004, before being transferred to the monthly seinen magazine Ultra Jump in 2005. The series can be broken into nine distinct parts, each, following a different descendant of the protagonist of the first part on different quests. The eighth story arc, JoJolion, started in 2011 and ended in 2021.

The chapters are collected and published into tankōbon volumes by Shueisha, with the first released on August 10, 1987. During Part 5, which takes place in Italy, the series' title was written in Italian as Le Bizzarre Avventure di GioGio. After volume 63, the beginning of each Part has reset the volume number count back at one.

The series was licensed for an English-language release in North America by Viz Media. However, instead of starting with Part one, they chose to only release Part 3 Stardust Crusaders, which is the most well-known. The first volume was released on November 8, 2005, with the first twelve volumes summarized in an eight-page summary written and drawn by Araki himself, and the last on December 7, 2010. Viz Media began publishing the JoJonium edition of the first part Phantom Blood digitally in September 2014, with a three-volume hardcover print edition that includes color pages following throughout 2015. They began publishing a similar edition of Battle Tendency digitally in March 2015 and in print in November 2015. They began re-releasing Stardust Crusaders in November 2016, this time in the same hardcover edition as the previous two parts. JoJo's Bizarre Adventure has also seen domestic releases in Italy by Star Comics, in France by J'ai Lu and Tonkam, Taiwan by Da Ran Culture Enterprise and Tong Li Publishing, and in Malaysia by Comics House.

Volume list

Part 1: Phantom Blood

Part 2: Battle Tendency

Part 3: Stardust Crusaders

Part 4: Diamond Is Unbreakable

Part 5: Golden Wind

Part 6: Stone Ocean

Part 7: Steel Ball Run

Part 8: JoJolion

References 

Volumes
JoJo's Bizarre Adventure